Anzelo Tuitavuki (born 10 October 1998) is a New Zealand rugby union player, who currently plays as a wing for  in New Zealand's domestic National Provincial Championship competition and for  in Super Rugby.

On 27 May 2022, Tuitavuki – who is of Tongan descent – was named in the Tongan national team for the 2022 Pacific Nations Cup and the Asia/Pacific qualification match for the 2023 Rugby World Cup. He made his international test debut for Tonga on 2 July 2022 against Fiji.

Reference list

External links

NZ Rugby History profile

1998 births
Living people
New Zealand sportspeople of Tongan descent
People educated at Liston College
Rugby union players from Auckland
New Zealand rugby union players
Rugby union wings
Hawke's Bay rugby union players
Moana Pasifika players
Tonga international rugby union players
Tongan rugby union players